Jey may refer to:

Jey, Iran, a village in Alborz Province, Iran
Jey Rural District, in Isfahan Province, Iran
Alih Jey, a Latin Grammy nominated Dominican Rock music singer and songwriter
Clarence Jey, a Los Angeles-based Billboard Record Producer
Jeffrey Jey (born Gianfranco Randone), an Italian singer, the former lead singer of the group Eiffel 65
Jey Crisfar, a Belgian actor
Jey Uso, American professional wrestler
Khedrup Gelek Pelzang, also known as Khedrup Jey, the 1st Panchen Lama

JEY refers to:
 Jersey, ISO-3166-1 alpha 3 code

See also
 Jay (disambiguation)
 Je (disambiguation)